The Justy is a series of subcompact hatchback cars manufactured by Subaru.

Justy may also refer to:
Cosmo Police Justy, a 1985 anime OVA based on a manga series by Tsuguo Okazaki
Justy Ueki Tylor, the main character in the anime series The Irresponsible Captain Tylor